Afër dhe Larg (Near and Far) is the third studio album by Albanian singer Elvana Gjata. The album received positive reviews by critics and reached a huge success in early 2011. The album contained tracks from Elvana from 2009, after her second album and new songs that were released later that year and the year after.

Track listing 
Credits adapted from Genius and Spotify:

Release history

References 

 

2011 albums
Elvana Gjata albums
Albanian-language albums